Edward O'Connor may refer to:

Edward O'Connor (politician) (born 1942), American Democratic Party politician
Edward O'Connor (hurler) (born 1964), retired Irish sportsperson

See also
Edward Connor (disambiguation)
Eddie O'Connor (disambiguation)
Teddy O'Connor (disambiguation)